Foreign relations exist between Australia and Papua New Guinea. Papua New Guinea is Australia's closest neighbour (roughly 3.75 km separates the two countries at Saibai Island) and a former colony of Australia. Both nations share the same continent. Papua New Guinea has developed much closer relations with Australia than with Indonesia, the only country with which it shares a land border. 
The two countries are Commonwealth realms. In contemporary times, Papua New Guinea is one of the largest recipients of Australian aid. Critics have pointed to instances where this has led to an outsized Australian influence on Papua New Guinea politics.

History 

The southern half of eastern New Guinea (the Territory of Papua) came under Australian administration in 1902, following annexation by the United Kingdom.  In 1920, Australia was given a League of Nations mandate to rule German New Guinea, and in 1945 Papua and New Guinea were combined in an administrative union.  The Papua and New Guinea territories consisted of more than 800 different tribes. Papua New Guinea was ruled by Australia until independence in 1975.  The two countries retained close relations, with Australia supplying development aid. Papua New Guinea's political institutions are modelled on the Westminster system, shared by Australia.

Recent situation 

Relations   between Prime Minister Michael Somare (PNG) and Prime Minister John Howard (Australia) were often strained, a strain which culminated in Somare being barred from entering Australia.

In 2001, relations were very good. A detention center was built on Manus Island, in Papua New Guinea, as part of Australia's "Pacific Solution". Refugee claimants seeking asylum in Australia were sent to Manus Island (or Nauru), and Australia paid for the costs of their detention, providing Papua New Guinea with economic aid. The last inmate was Aladdin Sisalem, who was kept in solitary confinement from July 2003 until he was finally granted asylum in Australia in June 2004. Australia continued to pay for the upkeep of the empty detention center until late 2007.

In March 2005, Somare was required by security officers at Brisbane Airport, Australia, to remove his shoes during a routine departure security check. He took strong exception to what he considered a humiliation, leading to a diplomatic contretemps and a significant cooling of relations between the two countries. A protest march in Port Moresby saw hundreds march on the Australian High Commission, demanding an apology.

In 2006, tensions between Papua New Guinea and Australia worsened due to the "Julian Moti affair". Moti, a close associate of Manasseh Sogavare, the then Prime Minister of the Solomon Islands, was arrested in Port Moresby on 29 September 2006 under an Australian extradition request to face child sex charges in relation to events in Vanuatu in 1997. After breaking bail conditions and taking sanctuary in the Solomon Islands High Commission, he was flown to the Solomon Islands on a clandestine PNG Defence Force flight on the night of 10 October, causing outrage on the part of the Australian government. Australia then cancelled ministerial-level talks in December and banned senior Papua New Guinea ministers from entering Australia.

In 2007, both prime ministers faced elections. Somare was re-elected, but Howard was defeated and succeeded by Kevin Rudd. Rudd soon set out to mend Australian-PNG relations. He met his Papua New Guinean counterpart in Bali in December 2007 to resume normal diplomatic relations. In March 2008, Rudd visited Papua New Guinea.

It was reported in November 2019 that Australia would directly loan Papua New Guinea $US300 million, via Export Finance Australia.

Polls
In a 2022 poll by Australian research group the Lowy Institute, 61% of respondents had a favourable view of Papua New Guinea. The only other countries from Oceania included in the poll were Tonga, which had a 67% rating, and New Zealand, which was the most favourably viewed country by Australians with a 86% rating.

External links 
 Australian High Commission in Papua New Guinea
 Papua New Guinean High Commission in Australia

References 

 
Papua New Guinea 
Bilateral relations of Papua New Guinea
Relations of colonizer and former colony